Pylon is the fifteenth studio album by English post-punk band Killing Joke, released on 23 October 2015 by Spinefarm Records, distributed worldwide by Universal Music Group. The album was recorded in the UK and the Czech Republic, and co-produced by the band and Tom Dalgety. It was preceded by the release of "I Am the Virus" and "Euphoria" was subsequently released as the album's second single. Jaz told biographer Jyrki "Spider" Hämäläinen that it was their Cold War album.

Reception 

Pylon has received an approval rating of 77/100 based on eleven reviews on review aggregator website Metacritic.

AllMusic wrote: "Pylon doesn't sound terribly innovative within the band's body of work, but the album's widescreen sound and bone-fracturing impact leave no doubt that Killing Joke are still deeply committed to what they do, and it's genuinely remarkable that they're still sounding this furious and effective 35 years after their debut album."

Pylon peaked at the No. 16 position on the UK Albums Chart, thus it became the third-highest charting album of the band's career (tied with 1994's Pandemonium). Pylon ranked at No. 10 in Rolling Stone's list of the "20 Best Metal Albums of 2015".

Track listing

Personnel
 Killing Joke
 Jaz Coleman – vocals, keyboards
 Kevin "Geordie" Walker – guitars
 Martin "Youth" Glover – bass, programming
 Paul Ferguson – drums

Technical
 Tom Dalgety - recording engineer, programming, mixing
 Amak Golden - recording engineer, programming
 Michael Rendall - recording engineer, additional programming
 Bert Neven - recording engineer
 Joe Jones - additional engineering & programming
 Reza Udhin - additional engineering & programming
 Jamie Grashion - additional engineering & programming
 Edward Banda - additional engineering & programming
 Tom Barnes - band photography
 Mike Coles - cover design

References

External links 

 

2015 albums
Killing Joke albums
Albums produced by Tom Dalgety
Spinefarm Records albums